Little Cannon River may refer to:

 Little Cannon River (Sabre Lake)
 Little Cannon River (Cannon River)

See also 
 Cannon River (disambiguation)